Syed Ali Muhammad Rizvi (born 1934 died April 2000), popularly known as Sachay or Sachay Bhai, was a famous poet and hymner of Karbala. He was initially based in Karachi, Pakistan and later migrated to United States of America.

Syed was also often called "Barry" in some circles, due to an uncanny resemblance to Sheikh Haider Abbas, resident alim of the Wali ul Asr Ismaili school.

Early life
Sachay Bhai was born as Syed Ali Muhammad Rizvi in Azamgarh village Bahauddinpur Division of the province Uttar Pradesh. He was born to a family of descendants of 8th Imam of Shia Muslims, Imam Ali ar-Ridha in 1934. He was the second sibling of four brothers and five sisters. At the age of ten, his parents migrated to Pakistan and settled down in Liaquatabad C' Area (Lalookhait) Karachi. He passed his Matriculation from Jacob Lines School, Karachi in 1957. He continued his studies and graduated with a Bachelor of Commerce degree from the University of Karachi.

Family
Sachay was married to Syeda Jamal Akhter Zaidi. They have seven daughters and one son, Syed Ali Raza Rizvi. Ali is also a well-established poet and Nauha Khwwan and has several Nauhas to his credit.
Sachay’s father Syed Yarwar Hussain was also a renowned religious poet and a number of elegy (Marsia) and Nauha are to his credit.
His published poetic work consists of Marasiy - e- Yawar, vol 1 and 2.

Sachay Bashay duo
Syed Ali Abbas Rizvi (Marhoom), popularly known as Bashay, was younger brother to Sachay and served as his co-reciter (Bazoo) till his death in early 90s. He also served as the main reciter of Anjuman-e-Zulfiqar-e-Hyderi when Sachay left for Canada in 1988. On many occasions Sachay himself praised Bashay and publicly declared that Bashay's voice is far better than his own.  The magic held in both brothers voices created a frenzy not only in Pakistan but around the world.

Early Work: 1951–1962
Sachay recited Nauhas and Manqabats at many occasions but was not taken seriously due to his young age. The first ever recognition of his voice and art of nauhakhwani was received in Shia Convention, Rizvia Society Karachi. Renowned Ulema and Scholars were invited from all over Pakistan in this convention which was held due to the efforts of Allama Ibn-e-Hasan Jarchvi. Sachay recited a six-stanza poem of Allama Mohsin Azamgarhi in the first day meeting:

شان اسلاف کی دنیا کو دکھا دو اٹھ کر

In the last day meeting he recited with his co- reciters another six-stanza poem:
کلمہ پڑھیں گے حق کا جب تک ہے دم ہمارا

Rise to popularity: 1962–1988
After the foundation of Anjuman-e-Zulfiqar-e-hyderi, Sachay presented nauhas in an unprecedented manner. He did not follow the conventional form of nauha khwani as was carried out by legendary reciters Chajjan Sahab and Afaque Sahab in his time. He introduced Hussaini anthems and six-stanza poems and brought them to public through his voice.

He recited the kalam of many poets including: Maulana Mohsin Azamgarhi, Maulana Syed Hasan Imdad, Maulana Naseem Amrohvi, Mujahid Lukhnavi, Sahir Faizabadi, Najam Afandi, Mehshar Lukhnavi and of his father Yawar Hussain Azmi. Sachay has many Nohas credited to his own name. Some of his credits include "Uncha rahay upna Alam", and Yeh matam sada rahay
. Even today the qalam Uncha Rahey apna Alam is recited worldwide by local sahib e bayaz. Sachay Bhai is highly remembered in Mumbai, India. Sachay Bhai is a Nauhakhwan that is often remembered worldwide. Sachay was the first who was invited to Radio Pakistan and Pakistan Television for Naat, Nauha and Manqabat recitations.

Anjuman-e-Zulfiqar-e-Hyderi (Regd.)
The Shia Muslims who migrated from India after partition and settled down in Liaquatabad C' Area, Government allotted them a plot for Masjid and Imambargah so that they could carry out their religious rituals. Publicly, Sachay started his Nauhakhwani from the same Imambargah which is famously known as "Masjid'O Imambargah Imamia". He then founded a registered organisation and named it Anjuman-e-Zulfiqar-e-Hyderi and was unanimously selected as its main reciter. Badshah Mirza Sahib was elected as the first president of the Anjuman.

Other than Bashay, Nazim Hussain also co-recited with Sachay in the early days of Anjuman but later changed his path and made a separate Anjuman with the co-operation of Bahadur Ali Jafri (Shaheed) and named it "Anjuman-e-Tableegh-e-Imamia". It is on the credit of Anjuman-e-Zulfiqar-e-Hyderi that founded the pillars of Azadaari in Karachi.

Migration to Canada and USA
In 1988, after the sudden death of his wife he migrated to Canada and then moved to United States of America. He was very warmly welcomed everywhere from Canada to USA and spread the Hussaini message throughout his stay there.

Once he settled in the United States, Sachay was constantly invited to cities all over the country to spread & express his unique way of writing and reciting poetry. He was also the pioneer of establishing the first Shab-e-Dari program in the United States at Mehfile Shahe Khorasan.

The pioneer cities for USA Shab-e-Dari's, include:

 Al-Khoei Center (Jamaica, NY)
 Astaana-e-Zehra (Englishtown, NJ)
 Idara-e-Jaferia (Burtonsville, MD)
 Mehfile Shahe Khorasan (Englewood, NJ)

Death
He died of profound illness on 18 April 2000 in Colombia Presbyterian Hospital, New York.

Legacy
He left 10 complete books of Nauhas recited by him and 40 audio cassettes and CDs, easily available in market.  His son Ali Raza Rizvi continues his mission in his spirit and follows in his great father's footsteps.  Many of Sachay's family members are known to recite in his manner in Canada, the USA, and Karachi till this day.

References

External links
 Golden Collection of Sachay Bhai on urdupinpoint.com website
 Sachay Bhai's complete Nohay Collection

1934 births
2000 deaths
Muhajir people
Pakistani performers of Islamic music
Pakistani emigrants to the United States
Pakistani poets
Pakistani Shia Muslims
University of Karachi alumni
Writers from Karachi
20th-century poets